Daewon C.I. (대원씨아이, 大元 C.I., Daewon Ssi Ai, formerly Daiwon C.I.), short for Daewon Culture Industry, is a subsidiary of Daewon Media founded in 1991.  This South Korean publisher releases domestic and imported comics, Newtype Korea Magazine, children's books, and light novels.  With Haksan Culture Company and Seoul Cultural Publishers, Daewon C.I. accounts for more than 50% of comics publications in South Korea.

History
Daewon C.I. was founded in 1991 as the publishing arm of Daewon Media.  Its initial publication was Comic Champ magazine in December of that year.  In 1994, they launched Young Champ, and followed with two additional monthly magazines in 1995, which are no longer in print.  Issue was also introduced that year as a biweekly magazine.  The first Newtype Korea was published in 1999, and in 2002, Mag X was launched in Thailand.  Its newest magazine, Super Champ debuted in 2006.  They currently have a magazine circulation of over 2,000,000 per year and publish 11,000,000 collected volumes of comics per year.

In September 2018, KakaoPage (now Kakao Entertainment), a Kakao company, bought a 19.8% stake in Daewon C.I. making it the company's second biggest stakeholder after Daewon Media.

Products

Comics
Daewon C.I. produces comics magazines that feature serialization of domestic and imported comics titles. Each magazine also has its own book imprint under which collected volumes of these comics are published. Its magazines are:

 Comic Champ, a biweekly first published in 1991, aimed at adolescent and young teenage boys.
 Young Champ, an online-only biweekly first published in 1994, aimed at young adults (changed to an online-only magazine in 2009, merging Super Champ's titles).
 Issue, a monthly first published in 1995, aimed at adolescent and teenage girls.

Light novels
Daewon C.I. publishes light novels under five imprints: Arche-Type (아키타입), Newtype Novels, Issue Novels (이슈 Novels), BLove (B愛 Novels), and Iliad (일리어드).  Series published include:

Allison
Baccano!
Ballad of a Shinigami
Black Blood Brothers
Bludgeoning Angel Dokuro-Chan
Full Metal Panic!
Gosick
Haruhi Suzumiya
Iriya no Sora, UFO no Natsu
Kamisama Kazoku
Kino's Journey
Kyōran Kazoku Nikki
Lillia and Treize
Maburaho
Read or Die
Scrapped Princess
Shakugan no Shana
Toaru Majutsu no Index
Trinity Blood
Voices of a Distant Star

Newtype Korea
Newtype Korea, first published in July 1999, is a glossy magazine released monthly.  It is the Korean version of Newtype from Japan, and covers Japanese and domestic TV, DVD, and theatrical animation.  Much of the content is translated directly from Japanese, with added features emphasizing domestic Korean productions.

Children's books
Daewon C.I. publishes entertainment and educational books for young children featuring a variety of characters.  These characters include Winnie the Pooh, Pororo the Little Penguin, and Digimon.

References

External links 
 Daewon C.I.

C.I.
Manga distributors
Comic book publishing companies of South Korea
Mass media in Seoul